Scott Hamilton Bairstow (born April 23, 1970) is a Canadian former actor known for his roles as Newt Call on the syndicated western television drama Lonesome Dove: The Series and as Ned Grayson on the American television drama series Party of Five. He was born in Steinbach, Manitoba, to Douglas and Diane Bairstow, professional classical musicians.

Career 
Bairstow first appeared on television at the age of 10, in a show called Let's Go. He moved to New York City when he was 17 and landed a part on the soap opera All My Children playing "Stuart Chandler" in flashback scenes to the character's youth. He had the lead role opposite Cybill Shepherd in the TV film There Was a Little Boy (1993) and has also appeared opposite such well-known actors as Kevin Costner in The Postman (1997) and Kris Kristofferson in Two for Texas (1998). He also played "Marty Stouffer" in Wild America opposite Devon Sawa and Jonathan Taylor Thomas (1997).

In addition to his roles on Party of Five and The X-Files episode "Miracle Man" (1994), Bairstow starred as the lead character, Newt Call, in the syndicated western television series Lonesome Dove: The Series and Lonesome Dove: The Outlaw Years. He also played the lead, Lt. Tom Hobbes, in Chris Carter's short-lived series Harsh Realm.
In 2003, Bairstow guest-starred on the two-part series finale of Touched by an Angel, playing a handyman named Zach and, later in the episode, "God". He played in Tuck Everlasting in 2002 as Miles Tuck.

Personal life 
Bairstow was married to Marty Rich from 1994 to 2000, and has two sons, Casey (b. 1995) and Dalton (b. 1998).

In May 2003, Bairstow was charged in Everett, Washington with second-degree child rape for allegedly sexually assaulting a 12-year-old girl, who is related to Bairstow's former wife, and later asking her to keep quiet about it. In December 2003, he pleaded guilty to a lesser charge—second-degree assault. Bairstow entered an Alford plea, under which he maintained his innocence but conceded that he would likely be convicted by a jury if the case went to trial. He was sentenced to four months in jail, one year's community supervision, and was required to undergo a sexual deviancy evaluation. He was also ordered to have no contact with the girl for 10 years and to pay for any counseling she requires.

Filmography

References

External links

1970 births
Living people
Male actors from Manitoba
Canadian male child actors
Canadian male film actors
Canadian male television actors
Canadian people convicted of assault
People from Steinbach, Manitoba
People who entered an Alford plea
20th-century Canadian male actors
21st-century Canadian male actors